The 2013 Billboard Latin Music Awards were held on April 25, 2013.

Awards

Hot Latin Songs

Latin Artist of the Year
Jenni Rivera
Don Omar
Prince Royce
Romeo Santos

Latin New Artist of the Year
3Ball MTY
Juan Magan
Jesus Ojeda y Sus Parientes
Michel Teló

Social Artist of the Year
Shakira

Streaming Artist of the Year
Don Omar -- Winner

Streaming Song of the Year
Don Omar and Lucenzo -- Winner "Danza Kuduro”"

Hot Latin Song of the Year
Don Omar and Natty Natasha — "Dutty Love"
3Ball MTY featuring El Bebeto and America Sierra - "Inténtalo"
Juan Magan featuring Pitbull and El Cata - "Bailando Por El Mundo"
Michel Teló — "Ai Se Eu Te Pego"

Hot Latin Song of the Year, Vocal Event
Don Omar and Natty Natasha — "Dutty Love"
3Ball MTY featuring El Bebeto and America Sierra - "Inténtalo"
Juan Magan featuring Pitbull and El Cata - "Bailando Por El Mundo"
Wisin & Yandel featuring Chris Brown and T-Pain - Algo Me Gusta de Ti

Hot Latin Songs Artist of the Year, Male
Don Omar
Daddy Yankee
Pitbull
Prince Royce

Hot Latin Songs Artist of the Year, Female
Shakira
Leslie Grace
Jennifer Lopez
Jenni Rivera

Hot Latin Songs Artist of the Year, Duo or Group
La Arrolladora Banda El Limón de René Camacho
Banda Sinaloense el Recodo de Cruz Lizárraga
Calibre 50
Wisin & Yandel

Airplay Label of the Year
Universal Music Latin Entertainment

Airplay Imprint of the Year
Disa

Airplay Song of the Year
Don Omar and Natty Natasha — "Dutty Love"
La Arrolladora Banda El Limón de René Camacho — "Llamada de Mi Ex"
Juan Magan featuring Pitbull and El Cata - "Bailando Por El Mundo"
Michel Teló — "Ai Se Eu Te Pego"

Digital Song of the Year
Don Omar and Natti Natasha — "Dutty Love"
Don Omar and Lucenzo — "Danza Kuduro"
Romeo Santos and Usher - "Promise"
Michel Teló — "Ai Se Eu Te Pego"

Crossover Artist of the Year
Rihanna
Chris Brown
Flo Rida
PSY

Top Latin Albums

Latin Album of the Year
Romeo Santos  — Formula, Vol. 1
Jenni Rivera — Joyas Prestadas (Pop)
Jenni Rivera — La Misma Gran Señora
Prince Royce — Phase II

Top Latin Albums Artist of the Year, Male
Prince Royce
Don Omar
Gerardo Ortiz
Romeo Santos

Top Latin Albums Artist of the Year, Female
Jenni Rivera
Ednita Nazario
Shakira
Yuridia

Top Latin Albums Artist of the Year, Duo or Group
Maná
3Ball MTY
La Arrolladora Banda El Limón de René Camacho
Wisin & Yandel

Digital Album of the Year
Romeo Santos  — Formula, Vol. 1
Don Omar — Don Omar Presents MTO²: New Generation
Prince Royce — Phase II
Wisin & Yandel — Líderes

Top Latin Albums Label of the Year
Universal Music Latin Entertainment

Top Latin Albums Imprint of the Year
Fonovisa Records

Latin Pop

Latin Pop Airplay Song of the Year
Michel Teló - "Ai Se Eu Te Pego"
Jesse & Joy — "¡Corre!"
Shakira — "Addicted to You"
Wisin Y Yandel featuring Chris Brown and T-Pain - "Algo Me Gusta de Ti"

Latin Pop Airplay Artist of the Year, Solo
Shakira
Ricardo Arjona
Enrique Iglesias
Michel Teló

Latin Pop Airplay Artist of the Year, Duo or Group
Jesse & Joy
Maná
Reik
Wisin & Yandel

Latin Pop Airplay Label of the Year
Sony Music Latin

Latin Pop Airplay Imprint of the Year
Sony Music Latin

Latin Pop Album of the Year
Jenni Rivera — Joyas Prestadas (Pop)
Ricardo Arjona - Independiente
Maná — Drama y Luz
Alejandro Sanz — La Música No Se Toca

Latin Pop Albums Artist of the Year, Solo
Jenni Rivera
Ricardo Arjona
Alejandro Sanz
Shakira

Latin Pop Albums Artist of the Year, Duo or Group
Maná
Camila
Il Volo
Jesse & Joy

Latin Pop Albums Label of the Year
Universal Music Latin Entertainment

Latin Pop Albums Imprint of the Year
Sony Music Latin

Latin World Tour

Latin Touring Artist of the Year
'Enrique Iglesias and Jennifer López Tour'
 Vicente Fernández
 GIGANT3S: Marc Anthony, Chayanne & Marco Antonio Solís
 Maná

Tropical

Tropical Song of the Year
Prince Royce – "Incondicional"
 Romeo Santos - "La Diabla"
 Prince Royce - "Las Cosas Pequeñas"
 Romeo Santos & Usher - "Promises"

Tropical Songs Artist of the Year, Solo
Prince Royce

Tropical Songs Artist of the Year, Duo or Group
Chino & Nacho

Tropical Songs Airplay Label of the Year
Sony Music Latin

Tropical Songs Airplay Imprint of the Year
Top Stop

Tropical Album of the Year
Romeo Santos – Formula, Vol. 1

Tropical Albums Artist of the Year, Solo
Prince Royce

Tropical Albums Artist of the Year, Duo or Group
Aventura

Tropical Albums Label of the Year
Sony Music Latin

Tropical Albums Imprint of the Year
Sony Music Latin

Regional Mexican

Regional Mexican Song of the Year
3BallMTY and El Bebeto y América Sierra – "Inténtalo"
 Gerardo Ortíz - "Amor Confuso"
 La Arrolladora Banda El Limón - "Llamada De Mi Ex"
 Espinoza Paz - "Un Hombre Normal"

Regional Mexican Songs Artist of the Year, Solo
Gerardo Ortiz

Regional Mexican Songs Artist of the Year, Duo or Group
La Arrolladora Banda El Limón De Rene Camacho

Regional Mexican Airplay Label of the Year
Universal Music Latin Entertainment

Regional Mexican Airplay Imprint of the Year
Disa

Regional Mexican Album of the Year
Jenni Rivera La Misma Gran Señora

Regional Mexican Albums Artist of the Year, Solo
Jenni Rivera

Regional Mexican Albums Artist of the Year, Duo or Group
La Arrolladora Banda El Limón De Rene Camacho

Regional Mexican Albums Label of the Year
Universal Music Latin Entertainment

Regional Mexican Albums Imprint of the Year
Fonovisa Records

Latin Rhythm

Latin Rhythm Song of the Year
Don Omar  & Natti Natasha – "Dutty Love"
 Juan Magan ft Pitbull and El Cata - "Bailando Por El Mundo
 Don Omar - Hasta Que Salga el Sol
 Lovumba - Daddy Yankee

Latin Rhythm Songs Artist of the Year, Solo
Don Omar

Latin Rhythm Songs Artist of the Year, Duo or Group
Wisin & Yandel

Latin Rhythm Airplay Label of the Year
Universal Music Latin Entertainment

Latin Rhythm Airplay Imprint of the Year
Machete Music

Latin Rhythm Album of the Year
Don Omar – Don Omar Presents MT02: New Generation

Latin Rhythm Albums Artist of the Year, Solo
Don Omar

Latin Rhythm Albums Artist of the Year, Duo or Group
Wisin & Yandel

Latin Rhythm Albums Label of the Year
Universal Music Latin Entertainment

Latin Rhythm Albums Imprint of the Year
Machete Music

Writers, Producers, Publishers

Songwriter of the Year
sidro Chávez “Espinoza Paz” Espinoza

Publisher of the Year
Arpa Musical, LLC, BMI

Publishing Corporation of the Year
EMI Music

Producer of the Year
Fernando Camacho Tirado

Spirit Of Hope
Maná

Billboard Lifetime achievement award
José José

References

Billboard Latin Music Awards
Latin Billboard Music Awards
Latin Billboard Music Awards
Latin Billboard Music Awards
Latin Billboard Music Awards